Chaetogastra mollis is a species of flowering plant in the family Melastomataceae, native to western South America (Colombia, Ecuador and Peru). It was first described by Aimé Bonpland as Rhexia mollis in part of Monographia Melastomacearum, volume 2, published in 1808. Its synonyms include Tibouchina mollis.

References

mollis
Flora of Colombia
Flora of Ecuador
Flora of Peru
Plants described in 1808